Archeosolenocera straeleni is an extinct species of prawn, the only species in the genus Archeosolenocera.

References

Dendrobranchiata
Jurassic crustaceans
Fossils of France